Dinenympha is a genus of Excavata.

It includes the species Dinenympha exilis.

References 

Excavata genera
Metamonads